Viktor Hey (born 2 February 1996) is a Ukrainian football midfielder who played for Kisvárda.

Career
Hey is a product of the Mukacheve Youth Sportive School System. In 2013, he signed a contract with FC Hoverla, but played only in the FC Hoverla Uzhhorod reserves. In the main-team squad Hey made his debut playing as a substitute in the match against FC Dynamo Kyiv on 16 April 2016 in the Ukrainian Premier League.

Personal life
He is the son of Ukrainian footballer Viktor Hey Sr.

References

External links

1996 births
Living people
Ukrainian footballers
FC Hoverla Uzhhorod players
Ukrainian Premier League players
Kisvárda FC players
Nemzeti Bajnokság I players
Ukrainian expatriate footballers
Expatriate footballers in Hungary
Ukrainian expatriate sportspeople in Hungary
Association football midfielders
MFA Mukachevo players